A Damsel in Distress is a silent romantic comedy film released in 1919, starring June Caprice and Creighton Hale. The film is based on the 1919 novel A Damsel in Distress by English humorist P. G. Wodehouse. The director was George Archainbaud. The same novel later inspired a 1937 film.

Cast

 June Caprice as Maud Marsh
 Creighton Hale as George Bevan
 William H. Thompson as John W. Marsh
 Charlotte Granville as Mrs. Caroline Byng
 Arthur Albro as Reggie Byng
 George Trimble as Keggs
 Katherine Johnson as Alice Farraday
 Mark Smith as Percy Marsh

Production
The film was directed by George Archainbaud, with Philip Masi as assistant director. The art director was Henri Menessier.

References

External links
 

1919 films
American romantic comedy films
Films based on works by P. G. Wodehouse
American black-and-white films
American silent feature films
1919 romantic comedy films
Pathé Exchange films
Films directed by George Archainbaud
1910s American films
Silent romantic comedy films
Silent American comedy films
1910s English-language films